Preußen or Preussen is the German word for Prussia.

It also refers to:

Ships
 Preußen (ship), windjammer built in 1902
 SMS Preußen (1873), armored frigate
 SMS Preußen (1903), pre-dreadnought Battleship
 , vorpostenboot

Football
 BFC Preussen, football club in Berlin
 SC Preußen Münster, football club in Münster
 SV Viktoria Preußen 07, football club in Frankfurt
 Preußen Danzig, former football club in Danzig (Gdańsk)

Other
 5628 Preussen, asteroid

See also
 Preußisch (disambiguation)
 Prussia (disambiguation)

German words and phrases